Today We Rebel is the third album by KB. Reach Records released the project on October 20, 2017.

Accolades

On August 8, 2018, the Gospel Music Association announced the nominees of the 49th Annual GMA Dove Awards, with Today We Rebel in the running for the Rap/Hip Hop Album of the Year award. On October 16, 2018, Today We Rebel won the Rap/Hip Hop Album of the Year award at the 49th Annual GMA Dove Awards ceremony held at Lipscomb University's Allen Arena in Nashville, Tennessee.

Track listing

Charts

References

2017 albums
KB (rapper) albums